Yevgenia Georgievna Pobedimova (1898-1973) was a Russian-Soviet botanist and plant collector noted for describing over 270 species in Russia, Ukraine and North Asia.

Career
She received a Ph.D. in biological sciences from the Komarov Botanical Institute in Leningrad in the late 1930s and although in 1941 she was appointed as a senior research fellow, she was transferred to war work.  In 1944 she returned to Leningrad, and participated in the restoration of the Botanical Institute.

During the Second World War she initially worked in a hospital in Leningrad and then in 1942 was evacuated first to Frunze and finally to Kazan.

During her career, she was very active as a plant collector. In 1930-1931 she travelled to Mongolia and then to Central Asia in 1932. In 1946-1947 and 1949 she visited the Caucasus and Crimea and she was in the Mongolian Altai in 1953.

Publications
She was involved in production of monographs about several plant families, including Apocynaceae, Thymelaeaceae and Balsaminaceae, as well as working on numerous genera for the Botanical Atlas and the List of Plants of the Herbarium of the Flora of the USSR. In the last years of her life, she published monographs of the genera Honckenya, Cakile, and Cochlearia.
 

Her publications include:
Pobedimova E.G. (1935) Vegetation of the central part of the Mongolian Altai // Transactions of the Mongolian Commission of the USSR Academy of Sciences. - L. - Issue. 19. - S. 1-77.

Legacy

Several species were named in her honor, including 
Galium pobedimovae Balde, 2012 
Taraxacum pobedimovae Schischk. , 1964 [=  Taraxacum hybernum Steven, 1856 ]
Viola pobedimovae Ye.V. Serg. , 1961 [=  Viola nemoralis Kütz. , 1832 ]

References 

1898 births
1973 deaths
Soviet botanists
Soviet women scientists
Russian women botanists